Alain Sarde is a French film producer and actor.

Early life
Alain Sarde was born on 28 March 1952 in Boulogne-Billancourt, France.

Career
David Lynch's Mulholland Drive, a film Sarde co-produced, received the Online Film Critics Society Award for Best Picture. The Pianist was nominated for the Academy Award for Best Picture and won the BAFTA Award for Best Film. Another film of his – Intimate Strangers – is being remade by Paramount Pictures.

Filmography
Don't Touch The White Woman! (1974)
Barocco (1976)
First Name: Carmen (1983)
My Best Friend's Girl (1983)
Mixed Blood (1985)
Bitter Moon (1992)
L.627 (1992)
Wild Reeds (1994)
L'Appât (1995)
Nelly and Mr. Arnaud (1995)
Ponette (1996)
La Belle Verte (1996)
Dry Cleaning (1997)
An Air So Pure (1997)
Place Vendôme (1998)
Alice and Martin (1998)
Children of the Century (1999)
Le coeur à l'ouvrage (2000)
Water Drops on Burning Rocks (2000)
 To Matthieu (2000)
Les Acteurs (2000)
Belphégor - Le fantôme du Louvre (2001)
Chaos (2001)
Mulholland Drive (2001)
Speak to Me of Love (2002)
The Pianist (2002)
Jet Lag (2002)
Sole Sisters (2003)
Life Is a Miracle (2004)
Notre musique (2004)
Intimate Strangers (2004)
Oliver Twist (2005)

References

External links

1952 births
Living people
People from Boulogne-Billancourt
Filmmakers who won the Best Film BAFTA Award
French film producers
French male film actors